A captured court rubber-stamps the wishes of a political party or interest group rather than applying the law. It may be nominally independent, but judicial appointments, disciplinary measures for judges who rule against the government, or other control mechanisms are used to influence judicial rulings.

See also
State capture
Regulatory capture

Further reading

References

Informal legal terminology
Types of trials
Courts by type
Abuse of the legal system